Chachacumani (possibly from Quechua chachakuma a medical plant, -ni an Aymara suffix to indicate ownership, "the one with the chachakuma plant) is a mountain in the Vilcanota mountain range in the Andes of Peru, about  high. It is located in the Cusco Region, Quispicanchi Province, Marcapata District. It lies northeast of Ananta. The Pucamayu (possibly from Quechua for "red river") which downstream is named Sayapata flows along its western slope.

References

Mountains of Cusco Region
Mountains of Peru